The Hybogasteraceae are a family of fungi in the order Russulales. The family consists of a single genus, Hybogaster, only known from southern Chile, and associated with living Nothofagus trees.

References

Russulales
Fungi of Chile
Basidiomycota families
Monogeneric fungus families